Dil Tanha Tanha is a Pakistani drama television series produced by Moomal Shunaid under her banner Moomal Productions and aired on Hum TV from 18 November 2020 to 1 April 2021. It stars Kiran Haq, Nazish Jahangir, Mohsin Abbas Haider and Ali Ansari in leading roles.

Premise 

The series revolves around the constant sufferings and despairs of women in our society due to inequality and unfair treatment. It tells that how man has taught to win in any case.

Cast 
 Mohsin Abbas Haider as Adeel
 Kiran Haq as Tooba
 Ali Ansari as Asfand
 Nazish Jahangir as Mirha
 Arez Ahmed as Sohail
 Fareeha Jabeen as Adeel's mother
 Farah Nadeem as Ammi
 Zubair Akram
 Kanwal Khan as Nimra
 Michalle Mumtaz as Maria
 Mehak Ali as Zeeshan's mother
 Shahzad Malik

References 

Pakistani drama television series
Hum TV original programming
2020 Pakistani television series debuts